The Oruawharo River is a river on the North Auckland Peninsula of New Zealand. It flows westward into the Kaipara Harbour west of Wellsford. It forms part of the boundary between the Northland region and the Auckland Region.

The New Zealand Ministry for Culture and Heritage gives translations of "place of [a] stretched-out pit" or "place of Ruawharo [a personal name]" for Ōruawharo.

History

In pre-European times, the Oruawharo River was important to the Tāmaki Māori people of the Kaipara Harbour. The Opou portage allowed waka to be transported across the Okahukura Peninsula between the Oruawharo and Tauhoa rivers.

See also
List of rivers of New Zealand

References

External links
Photographs of Oruawharo River held in Auckland Libraries' heritage collections.

Rivers of the Auckland Region
Rivers of the Northland Region
Rivers of New Zealand
Kaipara Harbour catchment